Mark Saul born March 9, is a Celtic fusion musician from Melbourne, Australia. He plays bagpipes, wooden flute, and tin whistle.

In the early 1990s, Saul played as a civilian member of the Grade One Victoria Police Pipe Band. In 1993, he left the band to pursue other creative interests, including forming the original band One with two people who shared his interest in combining traditional and modern music. In 1999, Saul formed the band Mumonkan with previous members of One and an additional rock guitarist. Around this time, Saul also accepted an invitation to join pop electronic/dance act Sonic Animation as a 'live' guest and touring member, contributing his knowledge of music performance and production to the already internationally recognized act.

Saul has published multiple volumes of his compositions for Highland bagpipes and has also written commercial music for TV ads and film. In addition to his musical interests, Saul holds a degree in graphic design. Mark currently works at Scotch College, Melbourne as the head teacher  for the pipes and drums program. He also is a composer.

Discography 
Mixolydian (September 2004, Greentrax)

References

External links
Mark Saul
Greentrax Recordings
Victoria Police Pipe Band
Scotch College

Year of birth missing (living people)
Living people
Australian musicians
Great Highland bagpipe players
Musicians from Melbourne